Mevo Beitar (lit. Beitar Gateway) is a moshav shitufi in central Israel. Located ten kilometres south-west of Jerusalem in the Jerusalem corridor, it falls under the jurisdiction of Mateh Yehuda Regional Council.

History
The village was established near the Betar fortress on 24 April 1950 by native Israelis and immigrants from Argentina who were members of the Beitar movement, including Matityahu Drobles, later a member of the Knesset. It was founded on the land of the depopulated Arab village of al-Qabu. Located around a kilometre from the Green Line, it was a border settlement until the Six-Day War.

References

Argentine-Jewish culture in Israel
Moshavim
Populated places established in 1950
Populated places in Jerusalem District
1950 establishments in Israel